Alphonso Boyle Davies (born November 2, 2000) is a Canadian professional soccer player who plays as a left-back or winger for  club Bayern Munich and the Canada national team. Considered one of the best full-backs in the world, Davies is nicknamed "The Roadrunner" for his exceptional pace, dribbling ability, and creativity.

Davies was the first player born in the 2000s to play in a Major League Soccer match. He joined Bayern in January 2019 from MLS side Vancouver Whitecaps FC on a contract lasting until 2023 for a then-record MLS transfer fee. Davies was named the Bundesliga Rookie of the Season for 2019–20. In that season he also was part of the team winning the continental treble after Bayern won the Bundesliga, the UEFA Champions League and the DFB-Pokal.

In June 2017, Davies became the youngest player to appear for the Canadian men's national team. By scoring two goals in a 2017 CONCACAF Gold Cup match against French Guiana, he became the youngest player to score for the Canadian men's national team, the youngest to score at the CONCACAF Gold Cup, and first player born in the 2000s to score at a top level international tournament. He would go on to be named the 2021 CONCACAF Men's Player of the Year. He was called up to play in the 2022 FIFA World Cup, where he scored Canada's first ever World Cup goal. He is widely considered both the best player on and the face of the Canadian men's national team.

Davies is the first soccer player, and first Canadian, to become an ambassador for the United Nations refugee agency, UNHCR.

Early life
Davies was born to Liberian parents in Buduburam, a refugee camp in Ghana, the fourth youngest of six siblings. His father, Debeah Davies, and his mother, Victoria Davies, originally lived in Monrovia, the capital of Liberia. They fled during the Second Liberian Civil War, which displaced more than 450,000 Liberians. In 2005, the family emigrated to Canada, eventually settling in Edmonton. At the age of 15, Davies relocated alone to Vancouver to join the Whitecaps FC Residency program. As part of the program, he attended Burnaby Central Secondary School. On June 6, 2017, he received Canadian citizenship; until then he had been a Liberian national.

Davies attended St Nicholas Catholic Junior High in the Edmonton Catholic School District. His school soccer teammate Onesphore Hamis recalled, "Soccer was the thing he wanted to get into, but language was a problem." His classmate and fellow Liberian immigrant Chernoh Fahnbulleh recalled of Davies, "He spoke English but it was, like, broken English".

As a child in Edmonton, Davies first played organized soccer with Free Footie, an after-school soccer league for inner-city elementary school students who cannot afford registration fees and equipment, or who lack transportation to games.

After playing for Edmonton Internationals, and Edmonton Strikers, Davies joined the Whitecaps FC Residency in 2015 at the age of 14.

Club career

Whitecaps FC 2
After joining Vancouver Whitecaps FC during their 2016 MLS preseason tour, Davies signed with Whitecaps FC 2 in the USL on February 23, 2016. At the time of his signing, he became the youngest player signed to a USL contract at 15 years, 3 months. Davies made his professional debut for Whitecaps FC 2 at the age of 15 years, 5 months in April 2016. On May 15, 2016, he scored his first professional goal, making him the youngest goal scorer in USL history at 15 years, 6 months, a record held by Davies until 2020. He scored two goals in 11 games played during the 2016 season.

Vancouver Whitecaps FC
Davies was named to the Whitecaps roster for the 2016 Canadian Championship on a short-term contract. On June 1, 2016, he made his first team debut in the first leg of the Canadian Championship against Ottawa Fury FC and started the second leg in Vancouver.

On July 15, 2016, Davies signed a first team contract with the Whitecaps through 2018, with options for the 2019 and 2020 seasons. At the time of his signing, he was the youngest active player in Major League Soccer, and the third youngest player to have signed an MLS contract. Davies made his MLS debut on July 16, 2016, becoming the second youngest player to play in MLS, behind Freddy Adu. In September 2016, he scored his first goal for the first team in the 2016–17 CONCACAF Champions League against Sporting Kansas City in injury time to send the club through to the knockout round. In September 2016, Davies became the second youngest starter in MLS history when he started a game against the Colorado Rapids. On October 2, 2016, he started against rival club Seattle Sounders FC earning a penalty kick. During the 2016 season, Davies played in eight MLS games, four Canadian Championship games, and three games in the CONCACAF Champions League. In the 2017 season, he played in both legs against New York Red Bulls and Tigres UANL in the CONCACAF Champions League quarter-finals and semi-finals respectively, in which he scored in a 2–0 win over New York Red Bulls.

Following his impressive early MLS appearances, Davies attracted interest and was scouted by European clubs including Manchester United, Chelsea, and Liverpool, and was also named one of the 60 best young soccer talents in the world in 2017. In the 2018 season opener against the Montreal Impact, Davies scored his first goal in MLS action, and assisted on a Kei Kamara goal. On June 10, 2018, he scored a goal and got three assists in a 5–2 win over Orlando City. Davies scored two goals and provided two assists to help his side defeat Minnesota United with a 4–2 victory on July 29. On June 29, 2018, Davies was included in the MLS All-Star roster for the 2018 MLS All-Star Game on August 1 against Juventus. Davies made an appearance during the match, which finished as a 3–5 penalty shoot-out loss following a 1–1 draw. Davies was named the Vancouver Whitecaps FC Player of the Year on October 24, and also received the Whitecaps' Goal of the Year award. In Davies' final game for Vancouver on October 28, he scored both goals in a 2–1 victory over the Portland Timbers.

Bayern Munich

2018–19: Vancouver to Munich
On July 25, 2018, Vancouver announced that it had agreed to a multi-million-dollar transfer of Davies to Bundesliga club Bayern Munich, with Davies seeing out the 2018 MLS season with Vancouver, before joining Bayern in January 2019. The base fee for the transfer was US$13.5 million, with performance-related bonuses that total $22 million, a then-record for MLS, later eclipsed by the transfer of Miguel Almirón to Newcastle United. Davies had his first training session with Bayern on November 21, 2018, and debuted on January 12, 2019, against Borussia Mönchengladbach in the Telekom Cup championship finale, which Bayern won on penalties following a scoreless draw. Davies made his Bundesliga debut on January 27 against VfB Stuttgart, appearing as a late substitute for Kingsley Coman in a 3–1 victory. He scored his first goal for Bayern on March 17, netting the final goal in a 6–0 rout of Mainz 05. In doing so, and at the age of 18 years, 4 months and 15 days, he became the youngest player since Roque Santa Cruz, twenty years prior, to score for the club. He is the first Canadian international to score for Bayern. On May 18, 2019, Davies won his first Bundesliga title as Bayern finished two points above Dortmund with 78 points. A week later, Davies won his first DFB-Pokal as Bayern defeated RB Leipzig 3–0 in the 2019 DFB-Pokal Final. Davies was not selected for the match day squad.

2019–20: First team breakthrough and Champions League triumph

Davies made his first Bundesliga start with Bayern on matchday nine of the 2019–20 Bundesliga season, going the full 90 minutes in a 2–1 home victory over Union Berlin. He made his first UEFA Champions League start on November 6, 2019, in a 2–0 victory against Olympiacos. Throughout the 2019–20 season, coach Niko Kovač moved Davies to the left back position, following long-term injuries to Niklas Süle and Lucas Hernandez, to allow David Alaba to play at centre back. Davies earned high praise during his time in that role, gaining an early reputation as one of the best left backs in the world. On February 25, 2020, Davies set-up Robert Lewandowski's goal in a 3–0 away win over Chelsea in the first leg of the round of 16 of the UEFA Champions League; his performance during the match was widely praised in the media, with pundit Gary Lineker commenting that Davies played "beautifully," while former U.S. international Stuart Holden described him as a "world class left back."

In April 2020, Bayern Munich and Davies agreed to a contract extension to 2025, adding two years onto his existing contract.

Following the restart of the Bundesliga which had halted all matches due to the COVID-19 pandemic, Davies started against both Eintracht Frankfurt and Borussia Dortmund. On June 16, 2020, Davies featured for Bayern against Werder Bremen in a game they won 1–0, securing Bayern Munich their eighth consecutive league title. Davies was named the Bundesliga Rookie of the Year for the 2019–20 season. 

On August 14, 2020, Davies, who was playing the left-back position, was applauded for assisting Joshua Kimmich's goal against Barcelona in the Champions League quarter-finals which Bayern Munich won with an impressive final score of 8–2. On August 23, he started in the Champions League final against Paris Saint-Germain, which Bayern won 1–0 to complete a continental treble; consequently, Davies became the first Canadian men's international to win the Champions League.

2020–present 
On October 24, Davies was forced off in the third minute of play in an eventual 5–0 home win over Eintracht Frankfurt in the Bundesliga, after sustaining an injury to his right ankle; it was later announced that he was expected to remain sidelined for 6 to 8 weeks.

Davies finished in third place for the 2020 Golden Boy award, behind Erling Haaland and Ansu Fati. On February 11, 2021, he played in a 1–0 win over Tigres UANL in the 2020 FIFA Club World Cup Final.

On January 5, 2022, Davies tested positive for COVID-19, prompting Bayern to do further tests and on January 14, it was revealed that he had developed mild myocarditis; he was unable to train with the rest of the Bayern squad. Davies is fully vaccinated against COVID-19 and had received his booster shot in December 2021.

On October 8, Davies sustained a cranial bruise while taking a foot to the face in the 45th minute in a challenge with Dortmund's Jude Bellingham of a 2–2 away draw.

On March 4, 2023, Davies made his 100th Bundesliga appearance in Bayern's 2–1 victory over VfB Stuttgart. The appearance made him the youngest non-German to reach that feat for Bayern Munich.

International career

Youth
Although a Liberian citizen by birth, Davies was called to numerous Canadian under-15 and under-18 camps in 2014 and 2015. On March 17, 2016, he was called up to the Canada under-20 squad for a friendly against England under-20. In November 2016, Davies attended a Canadian under-17 camp, where he scored against Jamaica. In 2016, he was named the Canada U17 Male Player of the Year for his performances with the under-17 and under-20 squads in friendlies. In March 2017, Davies stated in an interview that, "to be able to represent Canada, it is one of my dreams." In 2017, he was named the Canada under-17 Male Player of the Year for a second time due to his performances with the senior team.

Senior

Born a Liberian refugee, Davies was originally only eligible for the Liberian national team. On June 6, 2017, Davies passed his Canadian citizenship test and officially became a citizen of Canada, making him eligible to play for the Canadian national team. On the same day, Davies was added to a senior team camp for a friendly against Curaçao, as well as Canada's preliminary 40-man roster for the 2017 Gold Cup. Davies would debut for the senior team in the friendly against Curaçao at the age of 16, making him the youngest player to play for the national team. On June 27, Davies was named to the final 23-man squad for the 2017 Gold Cup. In Canada's first match of that tournament, Davies scored twice in a 4–2 victory over French Guiana. The goals made him the youngest goalscorer in Gold Cup history. He then scored in their second match against Costa Rica to earn a 1–1 draw. Davies went on to win the Golden Boot as the tournament's top scorer, the Young Player of the Tournament award, and was included in the tournament's Best XI selection.

On May 30, 2019, Davies was named to the squad for the 2019 CONCACAF Gold Cup. Davies was called up for a pair of 2019–20 CONCACAF Nations League A matches against Cuba on September 7 and 10, 2019. In the second match, Davies scored the decisive goal in a 1–0 victory for Canada. In October 2019, Davies would help lead Canada to their first win over the United States in 34 years, scoring the opening goal of their CONCACAF Nations League match, which ended 2–0.

In July 2021, Davies was named to the Canada squad for the 2021 CONCACAF Gold Cup, however he suffered an ankle injury on July 9, two days before Canada's opening match at the tournament, that ruled him out of the competition. On October 13, 2021, in a World Cup qualifying match against Panama, Davies scored a highlight reel goal, making an 80-yard run to keep the ball in play, reaching a top speed of 37.1 km/h. Davies played a central role in Canada's qualification campaign for most of the calendar, but he missed the final two international windows as a result of having developed mild myocarditis. His livestream Twitch commentaries on the remaining games attracted media attention, in particular his reaction to the 4–0 victory over Jamaica that officially qualified Canada for the 2022 FIFA World Cup. This was only the second time Canada had managed this feat, and the first time since 1986.

In May 2022, Davies was called up to the Canadian squad for two CONCACAF Nations League matches and a friendly. In the June 9 game against Curaçao, he marked his return to international competition after his myocarditis-related absence with two goals in a 4–0 victory for Canada.

In November 2022, Davies was named to Canada's squad for the 2022 FIFA World Cup. In Canada's first match of the tournament against Belgium on November 23, he failed to score an early penalty in an eventual 1–0 loss, with Thibaut Courtois saving his shot. Four days later, he scored Canada's first ever goal at the FIFA World Cup in the match against Croatia; however, Croatia came back to win 4–1, eliminating Canada from the tournament after two matches.

Style of play
Although mainly playing as an attacking full back on the left flank, Davies is capable of playing as a wing-back, left midfielder, or winger due to his explosive pace, dribbling, creativity, and crossing ability. He is considered to be a highly promising young player in the media.

Personal life
Davies was in a relationship with fellow Canadian Jordyn Huitema, a forward for Paris Saint-Germain and the Canada women's national team starting from September 2017. In September 2019, he was fined €20,000 for arriving late to a Bayern practice after visiting Huitema in Paris, and by June 2020, French press were aware that Davies might be interested in having Huitema sign with Bayern's women's side. On May 22, 2022, Davies confirmed on social media that he and Huitema had split up.

Davies is an ambassador for the United Nations High Commissioner for Refugees. In April 2020, he played a virtual football match against fellow professional Asmir Begović – who also came to Canada as a child refugee – to raise money for the agency.

Davies is a fan of the NHL's Edmonton Oilers.

Career statistics

Club

International
Appearances and goals by national team and year

 Scores and results list Canada's goal tally first, score column indicates score after each Davies goal.

Honours
Bayern Munich
 Bundesliga: 2018–19, 2019–20, 2020–21, 2021–22
 DFB-Pokal: 2018–19, 2019–20
 DFL-Supercup: 2020, 2021, 2022
 UEFA Champions League: 2019–20
 UEFA Super Cup: 2020
 FIFA Club World Cup: 2020
Individual
CONCACAF Gold Cup Best XI: 2017
CONCACAF Gold Cup Bright Future Award: 2017
CONCACAF Gold Cup Golden Boot Award: 2017
CONCACAF Men's Player of the Year: 2021
UEFA Champions League Defender of the Season runner-up: 2019–20
FIFA FIFPro World11: 2020
UEFA Team of the Year: 2020
CONCACAF Best XI: 2021
IFFHS Men's World Team: 2020, 2021, 2022
IFFHS Men's World Youth (U20) Team: 2020
Lou Marsh Trophy co-winner: 2020
Lionel Conacher Award winner: 2020
Canadian Men's Player of the Year: 2018, 2020, 2021, 2022
Canada U-17 Male Player of the Year: 2016, 2017
UEFA Champions League Squad of the Season: 2019–20
UEFA Champions League Breakthrough XI: 2020
Bundesliga Team of the Season: 2020–21, 2021–22
Bundesliga Rookie of the Season: 2019–20
Bundesliga Player of the Month: November 2021
Bundesliga Rookie of the Month: May 2020
VDV Bundesliga Team of the Season: 2019–20, 2020–21
VDV Bundesliga Newcomer of the Season: 2019–20
kicker Bundesliga Team of the Season: 2019–20
MLS All-Star: 2018
Vancouver Whitecaps FC Player of the Year: 2018
Vancouver Whitecaps FC Goal of the Year: 2018

References

External links

 DFB official profile
 Alphonso Davies at FC Bayern
 Alphonso Davies at WhitecapsFC.com
 

2000 births
Living people
People from Central Region (Ghana)
Black Canadian soccer players
Soccer players from Edmonton
Canadian soccer players
Liberian footballers
Association football wingers
Whitecaps FC 2 players
Vancouver Whitecaps FC players
FC Bayern Munich footballers
FC Bayern Munich II players
USL Championship players
Homegrown Players (MLS)
Major League Soccer players
Bundesliga players
Regionalliga players
UEFA Champions League winning players
Canada men's youth international soccer players
Canada men's international soccer players
2017 CONCACAF Gold Cup players
2019 CONCACAF Gold Cup players
2022 FIFA World Cup players
Liberian expatriates in Ghana
Canadian expatriate soccer players
Canadian expatriate sportspeople in Germany
Expatriate footballers in Germany
Refugees in Canada
Refugees in Ghana
Liberian refugees
Naturalized citizens of Canada